Arbutus unedo is an evergreen shrub or small tree in the family Ericaceae, native to the Mediterranean region and western Europe. The tree is well known for its fruit, the arbutus berry, which bear some resemblance to the strawberry — hence the common name "strawberry tree". However, it is not closely related to true strawberries of the genus Fragaria.

Its presence in Ireland also lends it the name "Irish strawberry tree", or cain, or cane apple (from the Irish name for the tree, caithne), or sometimes "Killarney strawberry tree". The strawberry tree is the national tree of Italy because of its green leaves, its white flowers and its red berries, colors that recall the Italian flag.

Taxonomy
Arbutus unedo was one of the many species described by Carl Linnaeus in Volume One of his landmark 1753 work Species Plantarum, giving it the name it still bears today.

A study published in 2001 which analyzed ribosomal DNA from Arbutus and related genera found Arbutus to be paraphyletic, and A. unedo to be closely related to the other Mediterranean Basin species such as A. andrachne and A. canariensis and not to the western North American members of the genus.

Arbutus unedo and A. andrachne hybridise naturally where their ranges overlap; the hybrid has been named Arbutus × andrachnoides (syn. A. × hybrida, or A. andrachne × unedo), inheriting traits of both parent species, though fruits are not usually borne freely, and as a hybrid is unlikely to breed true from seed.
It is sold in California as Arbutus x Marina named for a district in San Francisco where it was hybridized.

Description

It grows in hardiness zones 7–10.

The hermaphrodite flowers are white (yellow when desiccated), bell-shaped,  in diameter, and flower from a reddish hanging panicle in autumn. They are pollinated by bees, and have a mild sweet scent.

Twigs are reddish-brown and abundantly foliose, and often have small hairs.

The fruit is a red berry,  diameter, spherical in shape with a rough surface. It matures in about 12 months, in autumn, at the same time as the next flowering. It is edible; the fruit is sweet when reddish. Seeds are small, brown and angular and are often dispersed by frugivorous birds.

The name unedo is attributed to Pliny the Elder, who allegedly claimed that "unum tantum edo", meaning  "I eat only one".  It is not known whether he meant that the fruit was so good he could eat only one, or whether he meant that the fruit was uninteresting so he ate only one.

Distribution
Arbutus unedo is widespread in the Mediterranean region: in Portugal, Spain and southeastern France; southward in Algeria, Morocco, Libya, and Tunisia, and eastward in Italy, Slovenia, Croatia,  Montenegro, Greece, Turkey, Israel, Palestine, Jordan, Lebanon and Syria. It is also found in western France, Albania, Bulgaria and southwestern Ireland.

Its disjunct distribution, with an isolated relict population in southwestern and northwestern Ireland, notably in Killarney and around Lough Gill in County Sligo, which is its most northerly stand in the world, is a remnant of former broader distribution during the milder climate of the Atlantic period, the warmest and moistest Blytt–Sernander period, when the climate was generally warmer than today. The red-flowered variant, named A. unedo rubra by William Aiton in 1785, was discovered growing wild in Ireland in 1835.

Cultivation
Arbutus unedo is quite an easy plant to cultivate, and is adaptable to many climates. Once established it is fairly drought resistant, frost resistant, shade tolerant and salt tolerant.

Lower production of fruit mass has however been reported in case of summer droughts, and  frosts in flowering time were seen to decrease the numbers of fruits.

Arbutus unedo is naturally adapted to dry summer climates, and has become a very popular ornamental plant in California and the rest of the west coast of North America. It can grow easily in USDA hardiness zone 7 or warmer.

It also grows well in the cool, wet summers of western Ireland and England, and temperate regions of Europe and Asia. Pests include scales and thrips, and diseases include anthracnose, Phytophthora, root rot, and rust.

Unlike most of the Ericaceae, A. unedo grows well in basic (limy) pH soils, even though it does better in more acidic soils.

The fruit production is not very high and is highly variable on the weather, and that may be part of the reason this plant is not frequently cultivated. The average yield in a two years study is around 46 kg per hectare, and 180 grams per cubic metre of crown. However, very little work has so far been done in terms of genotype selection.

Arbutus unedo has been seen to form a mycorrhizal relationship. Inoculation with Pisolithus tinctorius has shown to greatly improve the plant's root mass, size, tolerance to drought and nutritional status.

In cultivation in the UK, the form A. unedo f. rubra
and the cultivar ‘Atlantic’ 
have gained the Royal Horticultural Society’s Award of Garden Merit

Propagation
Propagation can be done via seed, layering, or cutting.

The seed should undergo a one-month cold stratification period, then soaked for 5 to 6 days in warm water to improve germination success. Seedlings are prone to damp, and should be cared for in the first year.

Germination rate is low, rarely over 20%.

The success rate however is not very high.

Uses

Culinary uses

Arbutus berries have a high content of sugars (40%), and antioxidant vitamins such as vitamin C, beta-carotene, niacin, tocopherols, and organic acids that are precursors to omega-3 and omega-6 fatty acids (nearly 9%). They are edible fresh, but that is an uncommon consumption, especially because the mature fruit tends to bruise very easily, making transportation difficult.

They are used mostly for jam, marmalades, yogurt and alcoholic beverages, such as the Portuguese medronho, a type of strong brandy. Many regions of Albania prepare the traditional drink rakia from the fruits of the plant (mare or kocimare in Albanian), whence comes the name of the drink, which is raki kocimareje. In order to reduce the high content of methanol in the drink, the spirit is distilled twice.

The flowers are pollinated by bees, and the resulting honey is bitter tasting but still considered a delicacy.

Herbal medicine
Arbutus unedo'''s leaves have been employed in traditional and folk medicine in the form of a decoction said to have the following properties: astringent, diuretic, urinary anti-septic, antiseptic, intoxicant, rheumatism, tonic, and more recently, in the therapy of hypertension and diabetes.- Dr. Duke's Phytochemical and Ethnobotanical Databases: Ethnobotanical uses of Arbutus unedo. Retrieved 22 December 2012.

The leaves are reported to have a high concentration of flavonol antioxidants, especially quercitin, best extracted with a decoction, and together with the fruits are a source of antioxidants.

The leaves also have anti-inflammatory properties

The nectar contains the isoprenoid unedone (2-(1,2-dihydroxypropyl)-4,4,8-trimethyl-1-oxaspiro[2.5]oct-7-en-6-one) which is biologically active against a common and debilitating parasite of bumble bees, Crithidia bombi, so could provide a naturally occurring way for bees to withstand the burden of disease which has been reported to be a contributing factor in pollinator declines. The compound is glycosylated to an inactive form unedone-8-O-glycoside once consumed by the bee (perhaps to reduce any toxic effects against the bee herself) then transformed back to the active aglycone by the bee's microbiome in the hindgut where the parasite is most prevalent and damaging - suggesting that the microbiome assists in the anti-parasitic process.

 Ecological design 
In landscape design, ecosystem restoration or permaculture based designs, A. unedo can have many purposes. While the ornamental one is the most common, this can be a valuable plant also for restoring degraded ecosystems and preventing desertification. Being a pioneer plant and growing well also in poor soils, can be used in a wide array of situations.
 The flowers are a significant source of nectar and pollen for bees, while the fruits are food for the birds.
 Its salt tolerance, coupled with it being an evergreen, make it a good choice for wind barriers in lands close to the sea.
 A. unedo is fire resistant (can regrow after a fire), and being a pioneer plant can contribute to the discontinuity of fire-prone pines and eucalyptus monocultures; for the same reasons it is a good candidate for reforestation in Mediterranean areas.
 The dense foliage throughout the year can be a shelter for insects and small animals during the winter.
 Its extensive root system can help in the soil stabilization process.

Other uses
 The wood is quite hard and well suited for a various uses such as fire wood and to make pipes. Since it does not usually grow straight, it is not well suited for construction or similar uses.
 The tree is also grown as an ornamental plant, because of its nice-looking and -smelling flowers and fruit and their interesting presence on the plant at the same time, and because it is an evergreen. It is used as a single or multi-trunked ornamental tree, and as a specimen or hedge shrub in gardens and public landscapes.

 History 

Its Mediterranean habitat, elegant details of leaf and habit and dramatic show of fruit with flowers made Arbutus unedo notable in Classical Antiquity, when it was called Andrachne, and for which Theophrastos (4th c. BCE) wrote about it, as well as the ancient army medical herbalist Pedanios Dioscorides [De Materia Medica, Book II-150]; in addition,  Pliny thought it should not be planted where bees are kept, for the bitterness it imparts to honey.

The first evidence of its importation into northern European gardens was to 16th-century England from Ireland. In 1586 a correspondent in Ireland sent plants to the Elizabethan courtiers Lord Leicester and Sir Francis Walsingham. An earlier description by Rev. William Turner (The Names of Herbes, 1548) was probably based on hearsay. The Irish association of Arbutus in English gardens is reflected in the inventory taken in 1649 of Henrietta Maria's Wimbledon: "one very fayre tree, called the Irish arbutis standing in the midle parte of the sayd kitchin garden, very lovely to look upon" By the 18th century Arbutus unedo was well known enough in English gardens for Batty Langley to make the bold and impractical suggestion that it might be used for hedges, though it "will not admit of being clipped as other evergreens are".

In the United States, Thomas Jefferson lists the plant in his Monticello gardens in 1778.

The form A. unedo f. rubra and the hybrid A. × andrachnoides, have gained the Royal Horticultural Society's Award of Garden Merit.

Symbolic uses

Ancient history
The tree is mentioned by Roman poet Ovid, in Book I: 89–112 "The Golden Age" of his Metamorphoses: "Contented with food that grew without cultivation, they collected mountain strawberries and the fruit of the strawberry tree, wild cherries, blackberries clinging to the tough brambles, and acorns fallen from Jupiter's spreading oak-tree."

The name of the Italian promontory Mount Conero, situated directly south of the port of Ancona on the Adriatic Sea, derives from the Greek name κόμαρος (komaròs) indicating the strawberry tree which is common on the slopes of the mountain. Mount Conero, the only coastal high point on the Adriatic sea between Trieste and the Gargano massif in the region of Apulia, assists navigators to sail across the Adriatic sea since ancient times.

SpainThe Garden of Earthly Delights, a painting by Hieronymus Bosch, was originally listed by José de Sigüenza, in the inventory of the Spanish Crown as La Pintura del Madroño – "The Painting of the Strawberry Tree".

The tree makes up part of the Coat of arms of Madrid (El oso y el madroño, The Bear and the Strawberry Tree) of the city of Madrid, Spain. In the center of the city (Puerta del Sol) there is a statue of a bear eating the fruit of the Madroño tree. The image appears on city crests, taxi cabs, man-hole covers, and other city infrastructure. The fruit of the Madroño tree ferments on the tree if left to ripen, so some of the bears become drunk from eating the fruits. 

Italy

The strawberry tree began to be considered one of the national symbols of Italy in the 19th century, during the Italian unification, because with its autumn colors is reminiscent of the flag of Italy (green for its leaves, white for its flowers and red for its berries).

For this reason the poet Giovanni Pascoli dedicated a poem to the strawberry tree. He refers to the Aeneid passage in which Pallas, killed by Turnus, was posed on branches of a strawberry tree. He saw in the colours of that plant a prefiguration of the flag of Italy and considered Pallas the first national cause martyr''. Pascoli's ode says:

See also
Arbutus unedo hybrids

References

External links

Arbutus unedo — Calphotos Photo gallery, University of California
House Shadow Drake's page about uses of this tree in Welsh and Irish witchcraft

 Very wide-spacing article with many reference published on Forestry
 Plants for a Future website

unedo
Flora of Europe
Flora of North Africa
Flora of Ireland

Trees of Mediterranean climate
Plants described in 1753
Taxa named by Carl Linnaeus
Bird food plants
Garden plants of Africa
Garden plants of Europe
Ornamental trees
Shrubs
Drought-tolerant plants
Drought-tolerant trees
Edible fruits
Melliferous flowers
National symbols of Italy
Flora of Sicily
Flora of the Mediterranean Basin

az:Çiyələk ağacı